Himasthlidae is a family of trematodes in the order Plagiorchiida.

Genera
Acanthoparyphium Dietz, 1909
Aporchis Stossich, 1905
Curtuteria Reimer, 1963
Himasthla Dietz, 1909

References

Plagiorchiida
Trematode families